Margaret Johnson is the chief creative officer and partner at Goodby, Silverstein & Partners.  She is the first new partner in over a decade and the agency's first-ever female partner. In 2012, Business Insider recognized Johnson as the 10th most powerful woman in advertising.

Early life 
Johnson went to college to study journalism but became more interested in graphic design. She graduated from University of North Carolina with a B.A. in journalism and mass communication. She then went on to obtain a degree in art direction at the Portfolio Center in Atlanta, Georgia.

Career 
Johnson's first job was as a freelancer at Leanord Monohan Lubars & Kelly where she worked closely with Jeremy Postaer, whose work had inspired her. At this Rhode Island based agency, Johnson worked on accounts like Keds and Polaroid Corporation.

Johnson then moved to The Richards Group in Dallas, Texas where she applied her expertise to the work of video games such as Doom and Quake.

After a couple of years at The Richards Group, Johnson accepted a position at Goodby Silverstein & Partners. She was advised to join Goodby, Silverstein & Partners by acquaintances met during her time with Leanord Monohan Lubars & Kelly.

In 2019, Johnson was inducted into the North Carolina Media and Journalism Hall of Fame.

Notable works 
In the course of her time working with Goodby, Silverstein & Partners, Johnson has worked on a majority of the firm's agency accounts. She was a major contributor to advertising campaigns of Häagen-Dazs, PepsiCo, Yahoo!, and Logitech.

In 2008, Johnson produced a short film titled "Dunkumentary", which featured at the Short Film Corner at Cannes. She is currently working on a novel titled "Don't Kid Yourself" with her husband, Josh McHugh.

Personal life 
In April 2013, Johnson launched Out the Window, a blog which documents things she sees from her car window.

References

External links 
 Personal Blog
 Portfolio

Year of birth missing (living people)
Living people
University of North Carolina alumni
American advertising executives